Paopi 24 - Coptic Calendar - Paopi 26

The twenty-fifth day of the Coptic month of Paopi, the second month of the Coptic year. On a common year, this day corresponds to October 22, of the Julian Calendar, and November 4, of the Gregorian Calendar. This day falls in the Coptic season of Peret, the season of emergence.

Commemorations

Saints 

 The departure of Saint Abib, the friend of Saint Apollo

Other commemorations 

 The consecration of the Church of the martyr Saint Julius of Aqfahs, the Hagiographer, in Alexandria

References 

Days of the Coptic calendar